Luke Vibert (born 26 January 1973) is a British electronic musician and producer, also known for his work under several aliases such as Plug and Wagon Christ. Raised in Cornwall, Vibert began releasing projects in the 1990s across varied genres, including techno, drum and bass, and trip hop. He has recorded on labels such as Rephlex, Ninja Tune, Planet Mu, and Warp.

Early years: 1990s
Vibert's first musical output was in a variety of bands, including a punk act called Five Minute Fashion and later a Beastie Boys-esque group called the Hate Brothers, but he quickly moved into the low-cost environment of solo electronic composition.

Vibert grew up in Cornwall and attended the Wesleyan Methodist Truro School along with a number of key members of Aphex Twin's Rephlex Records crew. Luke and another school friend, Jeremy Simmonds, released an album on Rephlex under the name of Vibert/Simmonds which attracted attention from the Rising High music label. As a result of the popularity of the style in the early 1990s, Rising High commissioned an ambient music album from Vibert, who delivered Phat Lab Nightmare under the alias Wagon Christ in 1993.

Vibert pioneered the "drill 'n' bass" subgenre, which experimented with jungle and drum 'n' bass breakbeats, on his 1995 EPs under the name Plug. He would go on further over the next few years to produce more music under the Wagon Christ name for Rising High and Ninja Tune.

2000 and onwards
In late 1999 and 2000, Vibert began touring with BJ Cole to promote their fusion album Stop the Panic. In 2002, he would begin a series of live collaborations with Aphex Twin. Although Aphex Twin and Luke Vibert never released an album together, Aphex Twin used the song name "Analord", from Vibert's album Lover's Acid, for a series of EPs. Vibert's later releases varied in style as he released albums under various names, including Plug, Amen Andrews, Kerrier District and Spac Hand Luke. "Amen Andrews" is a word play on the name of Irish game show host Eamonn Andrews, referring to the fact that each Amen Andrews track uses the Amen break. In 2004, Vibert explored acid disco when he remixed a Black Devil song, which was released on Disco Club (Remix) and released his first album under the alias Kerrier District.

In 2006, Vibert's song "Shadows" was featured on the DJ mix album A Bugged Out Mix by Miss Kittin, which charted at number one-hundred seventy on the French Albums Chart.

In 2007 he founded a club night with Posthuman called "I Love Acid" after his track. In 2019 it won Best British Club Event in the DJ Mag awards. A vinyl-only record label of the same name was founded in 2014, with Luke contributing two EPs and an album "Valvable" written entirely on three pieces of Roland equipment: TB303, TR808, and JX3P. 

In 2015, he participated in the musical transmedia Soundhunters broadcast on the Franco-German channel Arte. For this project, Vibert appeared in the film Speak the way you breathe  directed by the American film director Antonino D'Ambrosio and composed an original music of the same name.

Discography

Albums

EPs

Compilation albums

Singles

Compilation appearances

Remixes

References

External links
[ Wagon Christ Biography] at AllMusic

Astralwerks artists
English electronic musicians
English record producers
People from Redruth
People educated at Truro School
1973 births
Living people
Ninja Tune artists
Nothing Records artists
Planet Mu artists
Rephlex Records artists